The South American Cadet Handball Championship is the official competition for Under-17 Men's and Women's national handball teams of South America. In addition to crowning the South American champions, the tournament also serves as a qualifying tournament for the Pan American Under-16 Handball Championship.

Men

Summary

Medal table

Participating nations

Women

Summary

Medal table

Participating nations

References

External links
 www.panamhandball.org

Handball competitions in South America